DLF Seeds A/S (formerly DLF-TRIFOLIUM A/S) is a global seed company dealing in forage and amenity seeds, sugar and forage beet seed, seed and ware potatoes and other crops. The company is headquartered in Roskilde, Denmark. DLF is the global market leader and provides grass and clover seeds to more than 100 countries. DLF operates within four different business areas. DLF is the market leader in forage and turf seed with an estimated share of approximately 50% in Europe and 30% on a global scale. DLF provides grass seeds for major sporting events worldwide, including the UEFA Champions League, UEFA Europa League, the FIFA Football World Cup for both men and women, The Olympic Games, The Premier League and the list goes on.

DLF’s research and development function spans globally with pan-regional exchange of know-how and genetics. DLF’s R&D structure benefits from synergies and expertise across the various crops. DLF’s ambition is to continue extending and investing as well as being the global leader within forage and turf related R&D. Furthermore, DLF strives to find and exploit synergies within the biotechnological area to strengthen and expand their position within sugar beets and fodder beets.

Business areas 
These four business areas, each of which have independent and different business dynamics, are run individually as their product portfolios, customer segments and supply chains all have individual characteristics.

 Forage and turf seeds including forage & turf grasses, forage brassicas, clovers and alfalfa, herbs and cover crops - organized in DLF Seeds and PGG Wrightson Seeds
 Sugar and fodder beet seeds - organized in MariboHilleshög. 
 Vegetable seeds, propagation and seed processing organized in Jensen Seeds. 
 Potatoes - organized in Danespo. 

The company produces approximately 300 different varieties that are components in several grass seed mixtures and brands.

Its corporate brands are ForageMax, Masterline, Turfline, Johnsons Lawn Seed and Johnsons Sports Seed.

Ownership 
The company is owned by 2,800 Danish grass seed growers through DLF AmbA, and employs more than 2000 people in over 20 countries. DLF supplies clover and grass seeds for more than 100 countries for purposes ranging from forage grasses for agriculture to turf grasses for both the professional and private markets.

Companies 
The company is vertically integrated in research, production, and sales. DLF's headquarters is in Roskilde, Denmark and is also present in The Netherlands, United Kingdom, Ireland, France, Sweden, Germany, Poland, Czech Republic, Italy, Turkey, Russia, China, Canada, USA, Uruguay, Argentina, Brazil, Paraguay, South Africa, Australia, and New Zealand.

References

See also 
Official website
Official website DK
Company History

Seed companies
Agriculture companies of Denmark
Companies established in 1988
Companies based in Roskilde Municipality
Danish brands